The Nguri were an indigenous Australian people of the state of Queensland.

Country
The Nguri were a people of southern Queensland, living around the Upper Maronoa River. Their northwestern limits was at the gorges of the Chesterton Range.

Alternative names
 Ngoorie
 Gnoree

Notes

Citations

Sources

Aboriginal peoples of Queensland